Biclavigera is a genus of moths in the family Geometridae.

Species
 Biclavigera praecanaria (Herrich-Schäffer, [1855])
 Biclavigera rufivena (Warren, 1911)

References
 Biclavigera at Markku Savela's Lepidoptera and Some Other Life Forms
Natural History Museum Lepidoptera genus database

Ennominae